The 1936 United States Senate election in Michigan was held on November 3, 1936. Incumbent Republican U.S. Senator James J. Couzens ran for re-election to a third term in office, but was defeated in the Republican primary by Governor Wilber Brucker. Brucker was defeated in the general election by Democratic U.S. Representative Prentiss M. Brown, becoming the first Democrat to win this seat since 1853.

Republican primary

Candidates
Wilber M. Brucker, Governor of Michigan
James J. Couzens, incumbent Senator since 1922

Results

Democratic primary

Candidates
Prentiss M. Brown, U.S. Representative from St. Ignace
Ralph W. Liddy
John Muyskens
Louis B. Ward, editor of Social Justice and aide to Father Charles Coughlin

Results

Ward contested the results and ran in the general election as a Third Party candidate.

General election

Results

Aftermath
Senator Couzens died on October 22. After his election, Brown was appointed to complete the remaining two months of Couzens's unexpired term.

See also 
 1936 United States Senate elections

References 

1936
Michigan
United States Senate